Steven Edward Loter (born June 17, 1973) is an American animator, storyboard artist, director, and producer.

Biography
Loter started his work as a director directing episodes of The Ren & Stimpy Show, where he learned from the team about helming an animated production. He later worked as a director and producer on Kim Possible starting on season 2, as well as on Brandy & Mr. Whiskers and American Dragon: Jake Long. Loter also directed the Happy Monster Band, Buzz Lightyear of Star Command, and Disney's The Legend of Tarzan series, as well as episodes of Duckman, Stressed Eric and Kevin Smith's Clerks The Animated Series.

In 2008, he directed a music video for the song "Hidden in the Sand", for the indie rock band Tally Hall. He was also an animation director for The Penguins of Madagascar, which won a Primetime Emmy Award in 2012 for Outstanding Animated Program.

Loter announced he was directing the feature film Tinker Bell and the Legend of the NeverBeast from DisneyToon Studios, at the D23 Expo on August 9, 2013. The film is from the Tinker Bell film series and is executive produced by John Lasseter. It was released direct-to-video on March 3, 2015. Loter, who was approached by Lasseter to pitch a Tinker Bell film, drew inspiration for the film's story on his daughter's love for animals and his own experiences as a father. Accordimg to himself, Loter practiced pitchimg the project to his wife. He worked with the production teams for Secret of the Wings and The Pirate Fairy to ensure continuity within the films.

In 2023, Loter will be an executive producer on Moon Girl and Devil Dinosaur, based on the comic book characters of the same name. Loter was contacted by actor Laurence Fishburne to serve as an executive-producer on the series due to his work on Kim Possible. Having been a fan of Marvel comics since childhood and excited at the idea of worling with Fishburne, Loter accepted. Loter and the team pitched the series to Disney with a roller-skating sequence featuring Childish Gambino's "Sweatpants", which was approved by Disney. From this position, he approached musician Raphael Saadiq to compose the score and provide songs for the series, being a fan of his; the two were previously set to collaborate on the cancelled Cars spin-off film Metro.

Personal life 
Loter is married, and has a daughter and a son. He took his daughter to the premiere of Tinker Bell and the Legend of the Neverbeast, their relationship having influenced the film. Loter was born and raised in New York City during the period before gentrification. Loter has a fear of large dogs, as he is not used to them due being forbidden within the building where he lives.

Filmography

Films

Television

References

External links

American animators
American storyboard artists
American television directors
American television producers
American animated film directors
American animated film producers
Living people
1973 births
People from Los Angeles
Primetime Emmy Award winners